CHCP may refer to:

 Certification of Health Care Provider
 Certified Healthcare CPD Professional, a certification program managed by the Commission for Certification of Healthcare CPD Professionals
 CHCP (command), a shell command for setting the console code page
 College of Health Care Professions, a for-profit college located in Texas
 Combined heat, cooling, and power production, a form of trigeneration simultaneous mechanical power production